CFZN-FM is a Canadian radio station with an oldies/adult contemporary format broadcasting at 93.5 FM in Haliburton, Ontario and is owned by the Vista Broadcast Group. It was founded by the Haliburton Broadcasting Group. The station uses an on-air branding as 93.5 Moose FM.

CFZN began broadcasting in 2006 after it was given approval by the CRTC on October 13, 2005.

On April 23, 2012 Vista Broadcast Group, which owns a number of radio stations in western Canada, announced a deal to acquire Haliburton Broadcasting Group, in cooperation with Westerkirk Capital. The transaction was approved by the CRTC on October 19, 2012.

References

External links
93.5 Moose FM

Fzn
Fzn
Fzn
Radio stations established in 2006
2006 establishments in Ontario